is a passenger railway station in located in the town of Nachikatsuura, Higashimuro District, Wakayama Prefecture, Japan, operated by West Japan Railway Company (JR West).

Lines

Station layout
The station consists of one side platform and one island platform connected to the station building by a footbridge. The station has a Midori no Madoguchi staffed ticket office.

Platforms

History
The Shingu Railway was nationalized on July 1, 1934, at which time the name was changed to its present name. With the privatization of the Japan National Railways (JNR) on April 1, 1987, the station came under the aegis of the West Japan Railway Company.

Passenger statistics
In fiscal 2019, the station was used by an average of 342 passengers daily (boarding passengers only).

Surrounding Area
 Katsuura Port
Nachi Katsuura Municipal Katsuura Elementary School
Nachikatsuura Town Hall

See also
List of railway stations in Japan

References

External links

 Kii-Katsuura Station (West Japan Railway) 

Railway stations in Wakayama Prefecture
Railway stations in Japan opened in 1912
Nachikatsuura